Milford is a village in Oakland County in the U.S. state of Michigan. The population was 6,175 at the time of the 2010 census. The village is located within Milford Township. The village is known for being the home of the Milford General Motors Proving Ground.

Geography 

Demographics

2010 census
As of the census of 2010, there were 6,175 people, 2,589 households, and 1,719 families living in the village. The racial makeup of the village was 95.7% White, 0.6% African American, 0.6% Native American, 0.7% Asian, 0.7% from other races, and 1.7% from two or more races. Hispanic or Latino of any race were 2.0% of the population.

There were 2,589 households, of which 31.4% had children under the age of 18 living with them, 49.9% were married couples living together, 13.2% had a female householder with no husband present, 3.2% had a male householder with no wife present, and 33.6% were non-families. 28.4% of all households were made up of individuals, and 10.2% had someone living alone who was 65 years of age or older. The average household size was 2.38 and the average family size was 2.93.

The median age in the village was 40.8 years. 23.5% of residents were under the age of 18; 6.8% were between the ages of 18 and 24; 25.8% were from 25 to 44; 30.9% were from 45 to 64; and 12.9% were 65 years of age or older. The sex makeup of the village was 47.4% male and 52.6% female.

2000 census
As of the census of 2000, there were 6,272 people, 2,427 households, and 1,706 families living in the village. The racial makeup of the village was 97.35% White, 0.16% African American, 0.38% Native American, 0.49% Asian, 0.35% from other races, and 1.26% from two or more races. Hispanic or Latino of any race were 1.32% of the population.

There were 2,427 households, out of which 38.3% had children under the age of 18 living with them, 55.0% were married couples living together, 12.7% had a female householder with no husband present, and 29.7% were non-families. 25.8% of all households were made up of individuals, and 8.9% had someone living alone who was 65 years of age or older.  The average household size was 2.55 and the average family size was 3.09.

In the village, the population was spread out, with 28.6% under the age of 18, 6.4% from 18 to 24, 33.0% from 25 to 44, 21.6% from 45 to 64, and 10.4% who were 65 years of age or older.  The median age was 35 years. For every 100 females, there were 91.2 males.  For every 100 females age 18 and over, there were 83.9 males.

The median income for a household in the village was $59,688, and the median income for a family was $71,333. Males had a median income of $53,393 versus $31,935 for females. The per capita income for the village was $26,159.  About 6.5% of families and 7.2% of the population were below the poverty line, including 13.0% of those under age 18 and 2.4% of those age 65 or over.

History 
The village of Milford began with the building of a sawmill by Elizur and Stanley Ruggles in 1832. Early county records indicate that the mill was erected in the "Township" at that time, and that formal organization would occur in 1834. That same year, the first gristmill was erected by Luman Fuller. In 1835, the first post office was established with Aaron Phelps as postmaster.

The Lower Mill Pond was created in 1836 to provide waterpower for the various types of mills and factories. The Upper Mill Pond followed in 1845. In 1911, the Hubbell Pond was created by a dam built on the Huron River to generate electricity.  The village was incorporated in 1869.

Hydropower made it possible for Milford to become one of the first communities to have electric lights, in 1892. A year later, telephone service was available in the Village. As a point of reference, nearby South Lyon did not have electric lights until 1932.

By 1939, Henry Ford built a carburetor plant and two hydroelectric stations intended to allow residents to maintain their agricultural work while working in the factories. The former carburetor plant was demolished in 2002. The Art Deco station still remains on Pettibone Creek in the village, and restoration work began in 2004.

(Historical information gathered from the Milford Historical Society, The Oakland Press, "An Account of Oakland County", listed in External Links.)

The summer of 2017 was the first year that the village has allowed golf carts on their streets. By November, only 10 carts were registered.

Government 
As a village, Milford is provided assessing, counties and school districts tax collecting and elections administration for county, state and national by Milford  Township. The Village of Milford is a Michigan home rule village with a council-manager form of government. The village is governed by a local charter adopted by village electors. The village council appoints a Village Manager to serve as the CAO of the government responsible for the management of the village's daily operations and oversight of all departments.

Milford is a part of the Huron Valley School District.

Notable people
 Lillian Hollister, temperance activist
 Mary Jackson, actress
 Thomas Lynch, poet
 Blake Pietila, hockey player
 Richard Pursel, animation writer
 Dax Shepard, actor
 Brian Steele, actor
 Jim Storm, hockey player
 Matt Wayne, animation writer
Violent J, rapper

Climate
This climatic region is typified by large seasonal temperature differences, with warm to hot (and often humid) summers and cold (sometimes severely cold) winters.  According to the Köppen Climate Classification system, Milford has a humid continental climate, abbreviated "Dfb" on climate maps.

References

External links 

 Village of Milford
 Milford Historical Society
 Milford Downtown Development Authority
 Huron Valley Schools
 Milford Hydroelectric Powerhouse
 Milford Times
 "Remnants Remain of Oakland County's Water Powered Past" - Oakland Press
 An Account of Oakland County - University of Michigan "Michigan County Histories" Collection
 The Spinal Column

Villages in Oakland County, Michigan
Villages in Michigan
Metro Detroit
Populated places established in 1832
1832 establishments in Michigan Territory